This is a list of companies which use multi-level marketing (also known as network marketing, direct selling, referral marketing, and pyramid selling) for most of their sales.

Active 

 5Linx
 ACN Inc.
 AdvoCare
 Ambit Energy
 American Income Life Insurance Company
 Amsoil
 Amway
 Amway Global, previously known as Quixtar
 Ann Summers
 Arbonne International
 Avon Products
 Barefoot Books
 Beachbody
 Beautycounter
 BioPerformance
 The Body Shop
 Cutco
 Discovery Toys
 doTerra
 Educo Seminar
 Forever Living Products
 FreeLife
 Fuel Freedom International
 Herbalife
 Isagenix International
 Juice Plus
 LegalShield, previously known as Pre-Paid Legal Services
 LifeVantage (Protandim)
 LimeLife
 Longrich
 LuLaRoe
 Lyoness
 Mannatech
 Market America
 Mary Kay
 Medifast
 Melaleuca
 Monat
 Morinda, Inc.
 National Safety Associates
 Nature's Sunshine Products
 Neal's Yard Remedies Organic
 Nu Skin Enterprises
 Omnilife
 Oriflame
 Pampered Chef
 Primerica
 Pure Romance
 Qnet, previously known as QuestNet, GoldQuest, and QI Limited
 Rodan + Fields
 Scentsy
 Seacret
 Shaklee
 SeneGence
 Southwestern Advantage 
 Stream Energy
 Success University
 Sunrider
 Tastefully Simple
 Telecom Plus
 Tupperware
 USANA Health Sciences
 Usborne Publishing
 Vector Marketing
 Vemma
 ViSalus
 Wakaya Perfection
 Watkins Incorporated
 World Financial Group
 XanGo
 Young Living
 Younique
 YTB International

Defunct 

 Betterware (placed into administration in 2018) 
 Black Oxygen Organics (shut down in November 2021)
 BurnLounge (shut down as pyramid scheme by FTC in 2012)
 Equinox International (dissolved in 2001)
 European Grouping of Marketing Professionals/CEDIPAC SA (dissolved in 1995)
 European Home Retail (dissolved in 2007)
 Fortune Hi-Tech Marketing (dissolved in 2013)
 FundAmerica (bankrupt in 1990)
 Holiday Magic (dissolved in 1974)
 Kleeneze (went into administration in 2018)
 The Longaberger Company (dissolved in 2018)
 Metabolife (dissolved in 2005)
 MonaVie (went into foreclosure 2015)
 Nouveau Riche (real estate investment college) (dissolved in 2010)
 NXIVM
 Seasilver (ceased trading in 2006)
 Solavei (dissolved in 2015)
 Royal Tongan Limu (dissolved in 2003)
 Sunshine Empire (dissolved in 2009)
 Telexfree (bankrupt in 2014)
 United Sciences of America (dissolved in 1987)
 WakeUpNow (dissolved in 2015)

References 

Lists of companies by industry
Marketing-related lists